John Fuell or Fewell (by 1523–73/75), of Shaftesbury, Dorset, was an English Member of Parliament.

He was a Member (MP) of the Parliament of England for Shaftesbury in October 1553, the first parliament in the reign of Mary I of England. This was a critical time, with the two most influential families, the Herberts and the Arundells out of favour, leaving the locals relatively free of coercion into accepting one of their candidates.

His wife, Elizabeth outlived him, and married again, to a man with the surname Temple. She inherited his estate; it appears they had no children.

References

Year of birth missing
1570s deaths
English MPs 1553 (Mary I)
People from Shaftesbury